Rochelle "Shelli" Van Den Burgh (born October 21, 1969) is a  former Democratic member of the Indiana House of Representatives, representing the 19th District from 2007 to 2014. She served as the Vice Chair of the Family, Children and Human Affairs Committee, and also served on the Small Business and Economic Development, Elections and Apportionment, and Education committees.

VanDenburgh was the Director of the Child Support Division in the Lake County Clerk's Office from 1995 until her resignation in May 2008. Appointed to the state legislature in July 2007 upon the resignation of Democratic incumbent Robert Kuzman, VanDenburgh subsequently won reelection three times in 2008, 2010 and 2012. In 2014, VanDenburgh was challenged by Republican Julie Olthoff in the general election. On November 4, 2014, VanDenburgh was unseated by Olthoff, losing the election 6,834 votes to Olthoff's 7,136, or, 48.8% to 51.1%.

External links
Shelli VanDenburgh for Indiana State Representative official campaign site

References

Democratic Party members of the Indiana House of Representatives
Living people
Women state legislators in Indiana
1969 births
21st-century American women